Ramón Galindo Noriega (born 1 September 1955) is a Mexican politician affiliated with the PAN. As of 2013 he served as Senator of the LX and LXI Legislatures of the Mexican Congress representing Chihuahua. He also served as Municipal president of Juárez between 1995 and 1998 and as Deputy of the LIX Legislature.

References

1955 births
Living people
People from Ciudad Juárez
Municipal presidents of Juárez
Members of the Senate of the Republic (Mexico)
Members of the Chamber of Deputies (Mexico)
National Action Party (Mexico) politicians
20th-century Mexican politicians
21st-century Mexican politicians
Politicians from Chihuahua (state)
Instituto Tecnológico de Ciudad Juárez alumni
Alumni of the University of Surrey
Members of the Congress of Chihuahua